The Gauntlet is an inverted roller coaster located at Magic Springs amusement park in Hot Springs, Arkansas. The Suspended Looping Coaster (SLC) model was manufactured by Vekoma and opened at the park for the 2004 season.

History
The Gauntlet was originally manufactured for Jazzland, a park located in New Orleans, however the sale was never completed. In late 2003, Themeparks LLC announced that they would purchase the roller coaster for their park Magic Springs. Themeparks LLC reopened Magic Springs in 2000, however attendance had not increased from the number of people that visited the park during its first season reopened. The name for the roller coaster was chosen through a widespread radio event in late 2003. Becky Branch of Jacksonville, Florida won the contest, choosing to name the ride "The Gauntlet."

The Gauntlet opened on April 10, 2004, and was well-received by guests. The ride's opening helped increase the park's attendance, as 403,000 people visited Magic Springs in 2004, surpassing the park's previous attendance record. In a 2015 survey conducted by The Weather Channel, The Gauntlet was voted as the most popular thrill ride in Arkansas.

References

External links
 Magic Springs' official website

 Roller coasters introduced in 2004
 Steel roller coasters
 Inverted roller coasters
 Roller coasters manufactured by Vekoma
 Magic Springs and Crystal Falls
 Roller coasters in Arkansas